Zirikly (Yerekle) is a rural locality (a selo) and the administrative centre of Ziriklinsky Selsoviet, Sharansky District, Bashkortostan, Russia. The population was 835 as of 2010. There are 7 streets.

Geography 
Zirikly is located 21 km northwest of Sharan (the district's administrative centre) by road. Sharlykbash is the nearest rural locality.

References 

Rural localities in Sharansky District